Cassini Regio  (adjective Cassinian ) is the enigmatic dark area that covers the leading half of Saturn's moon Iapetus. It is named after Giovanni Cassini, the discoverer of Iapetus; 'Regio' is a term used in planetary geology for a large area that is strongly differentiated in colour or albedo from its surroundings. The brighter half of Iapetus is composed of the Roncevaux Terra and the Saragossa Terra.

The nature of the material that caused the extensive discoloration of Cassini Regio is not known, but it appears to be quite thin. It may be the result of cryovolcanism, a spattering of material from outer moons, or residue left by the sublimation of brighter ice.

The origin of this extremely unusual feature is as yet unknown.

Cassini completed a  flyby of Iapetus in September 2007, and the images it has transmitted are helping to clarify the nature of Cassini Regio. For more details, see the main article on Iapetus.

References

Surface features of Iapetus (moon)
Regio